Harriet Jessica Phoebe "Hetti" Bywater (born 10 September 1994) is an English former actress. She is best known for portraying Lucy Beale in the BBC soap opera EastEnders, taking over the role from Melissa Suffield from 2012 until the character’s murder in 2014.

Early life
Bywater was born in Sedlescombe, East Sussex to Welsh parents originally from Swansea. She studied performing arts at The Theatre Workshop in Sussex, and from the ages of 13 to 15 attended Claverham Community College in Battle.

Acting career
Bywater began her career in 2011 by making guest appearances in Casualty and Doctors. She also had a minor role in the St George's Day film in the same year. Bywater had a guest appearance in the fourth series of Death in Paradise in 2015,. Between 2016 and 2017, Bywater guest-starred in two episodes of the first series of the Sky One drama Delicious.

EastEnders
Bywater’s most notable role was in EastEnders in 2012 as Lucy Beale, taking over from Melissa Suffield.[4]

In 2014, it was announced that the character of Lucy would be murdered, introducing a whodunnit storyline (“Who Killed Lucy Beale?”) that would run until the show’s 30th anniversary in February 2015, when the identity of the murderer was revealed. 

Bywater made her final appearance as a series regular on 18 April 2014, returning for a flashback episode on 19 February 2015 as part of the 30th anniversary celebrations.

Filmography

References

External links
 
 

Living people
People from Eastbourne
1994 births
British television actresses
English people of Welsh descent
21st-century British actresses
British soap opera actresses
Actresses from Sussex
English child actresses
British child actresses
People from Sedlescombe
21st-century English women
21st-century English people